A Regular Production Option (RPO) is a 3-digit standardized code used by General Motors to designate vehicle options & modifications. RPO codes designate how a vehicle is built, and they've been used on dealership order forms and in assembly plants since at least the 1950s (see Corvette C1). It was originally all numeric and labeled Sales Codes; in 1970 GM switched to the alphanumeric RPO code.

Even base vehicles with few optional features will have multiple RPOs, since both standard components (like engine, transmission, and paint color) and extra cost options are assigned codes.

The complete configuration of a GM vehicle (as it exited the factory) can be described by specifying the base model and a complete list of its RPO codes. Some dealerships are willing to run a VIN and print out its RPOs (with their definitions) free of charge. The records are in GMs' electronic database since at least the 1990 models. RPO decoder (for newer vehicles).

Beginning in (yr?), GM attached a Service Parts Identification (SPID) label in its vehicles, most often located on the back of the glovebox door OR in the trunk on the spare tire cover. The SPID lists all the RPOs built into that vehicle, in alphabetical order. These codes are sometimes needed during vehicle repairs to select the correct replacement parts. TECH TIP: Take a photo of the Vehicle Identification Number (VIN) and the SPID with you when purchasing auto parts. NOTE: Reproduction SPID labels may be purchased online from aftermarket vendors.

In 2018, the RPO Sticker was replaced by a QR code label located on the B-pillar (driver's side, between front and rear doors). While fairly complete, it does not contain every RPO that is on the vehicle.

RPO code details & format
RPOs may be generic options (available on all models over many years), or specific options (available only on specific models for limited years). RPOs codes are assigned to align with specific component groups and with UPC groups as tabulated below:

RPO codes as model names

A few RPO codes have become notable enough that they have been used as model names. The Camaro Z28 name came from an option code which specified a performance-oriented configuration. This happened again with the Corvette Z06 models. However most RPO codes that are promoted to model names are appearance packages only, and are not related to speed or engine performance. Two examples are the Z28 and Z71. In the 1980s you could order a Z28 Camaro with a 2.5 liter engine, although this was rare. RPO Z71 was an off-road suspension for trucks that is not related to the drivetrain. It became notable enough to be promoted to a package name, even applied as a logo sticker onto the rear quarter body panel. But although it usually came with four-wheel drive, you could actually order a two-wheel drive Z71.

Notable RPO codes
 L78: big block V8 engine by Chevrolet
 9C1: Chevrolet police package
 Z71: Truck Sports Package

References

General Motors vehicles
General Motors
Regular Production Option